Tu Chih-chen (born 3 March 1966) is a Taiwanese archer. He competed in the men's individual event at the 1984 Summer Olympics.

References

1966 births
Living people
Taiwanese male archers
Olympic archers of Taiwan
Archers at the 1984 Summer Olympics
Place of birth missing (living people)
Archers at the 1990 Asian Games
Asian Games medalists in archery
Asian Games bronze medalists for Chinese Taipei
Medalists at the 1990 Asian Games
20th-century Taiwanese people